A.K. is a 1985 French documentary film directed by Chris Marker about the Japanese director Akira Kurosawa. Though it was filmed while Kurosawa was working on Ran, the film focuses more on Kurosawa's remote but polite personality than on the making of the film. The film is sometimes seen as being reflective of Marker's fascination with Japanese culture, which he also drew on for one of his best-known films, Sans Soleil. The film was screened in the Un Certain Regard section at the 1985 Cannes Film Festival.

Cast 
 Shigehiko Hasumi as Narration
 Chris Marker as narrator in the French version (voice)
 Akira Kurosawa as Self
 Tatsuya Nakadai as Self
 Ishirō Honda as Self
 Asakazu Nakai as Self
 Takao Saito as Self
 Fumio Yanoguchi as Self
 Takeji Sano as Self (as Takeharu Sano)
 Teruyo Nogami as Self
 Fumisuke Okada as Self (as Fumisake Okada)
 Vittorio Dalle Ore as Self (as Vittorio)
 Tōru Takemitsu as Self
 Masato Hara as Self
 Shinobu Muraki as Self

References

External links 
 

1985 films
1985 documentary films
French documentary films
Documentary films about film directors and producers
Films directed by Chris Marker
Akira Kurosawa
1980s French-language films
Films produced by Serge Silberman
1980s French films